Aethiopana is a genus of butterflies in the family Lycaenidae, endemic to the Afrotropical realm. The single species, Aethiopana honorius, the acraea blue, is found in Guinea, Sierra Leone, Liberia, Ivory Coast, Ghana, Togo, Nigeria, Cameroon, Gabon, the Republic of the Congo, the Democratic Republic of the Congo and Uganda. The habitat consists of forests.

Larvae were found on Crematogaster-infested tree bark. The larvae are brown, very hairy and moth like.

Subspecies
Aethiopana honorius honorius (Nigeria: south and the Cross River loop, Cameroon, Gabon, Congo, western Uganda, Democratic Republic of the Congo: Mongala, Uele, Tshopo, Tshuapa, Equateur, Kinshasa, Sankuru and Lualaba)
Aethiopana honorius divisa (Butler, 1901) (Guinea, Sierra Leone, Liberia, Ivory Coast, Ghana, Togo, Nigeria: west of the Niger River)

References

Poritiinae
Monotypic butterfly genera
Taxa named by George Thomas Bethune-Baker
Lycaenidae genera